The Sceptre was a First Rank ship of the line of the French Royal Navy, the lead vessel in the two-ship Sceptre Class (her sister being the Lys).

This ship was ordered in April 1691 to be built at Toulon Dockyard, and on 13 May she was allotted the name Sceptre. The designer and builder of both ships was François Coulomb. They were three-decker ships without forecastles. The Sceptre was launched on 10 November 1691 and completed in March of the next year.

She was initially armed with 84 guns, comprising twenty-six 36-pounders on the lower deck, twenty-eight 18-pounders on the middle deck, twenty-four 8-pounders on the upper deck, and six 4-pounders on the quarterdeck. The 4-pounders were replaced by six 6-pounders by 1699; a thirteenth pair of 8-pounders (on the upper deck) and a fourth pair of 6-pounders (on the quarterdeck) were added in 1704, raising her to 88 guns.

The Sceptre took part in the capture of Cartagena de Indias in May 1697, and later in the Battle of Vélez-Málaga on 24 August 1703. She was scuttled at Toulon in July 1707 during the siege of that port, but was subsequently refloated. She was condemned at Toulon on 18 December 1717, and on 12 January 1718 she was ordered to be taken to pieces.

References

Nomenclature des Vaisseaux du Roi-Soleil de 1661 a 1715. Alain Demerliac (Editions Omega, Nice – various dates).
The Sun King's Vessels (2015) - Jean-Claude Lemineur; English translation by François Fougerat. Editions ANCRE.  
Winfield, Rif and Roberts, Stephen (2017) French Warships in the Age of Sail 1626-1786: Design, Construction, Careers and Fates. Seaforth Publishing. . 

Ships of the line of the French Navy
1690s ships